Jóannes Bjartalíð (born 10 July 1996) is a Faroese footballer who plays as a midfielder for Fredrikstad and the Faroe Islands national team.

Career
Bjartalíð made his international debut for Faroe Islands on 5 September 2019 in a UEFA Euro 2020 qualifying match against Sweden, which finished as a 0–4 home loss.

Career statistics

International

Scores and results list Faroe Islands goal tally first.

Honours
KÍ
 Faroe Islands Premier League: 2019, 2021
 Faroe Islands Cup: 2016
 Faroe Islands Super Cup: 2020

References

External links
 
 
 

1996 births
Living people
People from Klaksvík
Faroese footballers
Faroe Islands under-21 international footballers
Faroe Islands international footballers
Association football midfielders
KÍ Klaksvík players
Faroe Islands Premier League players